Comas is a district in Lima, Perú. It is located in the north area of the city. It is one of the most populous districts in the Lima.

Geography
Comas has a total land area of 48.75 km². Its administrative center is located 140 meters above sea level.

Boundaries
 North: Carabayllo
 East: San Juan de Lurigancho
 South: Independencia
 West: Puente Piedra and Los Olivos

Demographics
According to 2005 census conducted by the INEI, Comas has 464,745 inhabitants, a population density of 9,533.2 persons/km² and 100,950 households.

History

During its first years of existence, Comas was a pueblo joven. Comas humble beginnings were a direct result of the many organized invasions led by immigrants from the highlands during the 1970s. Most of these peasants arrived from the regions of Junín and Huacanvelica in the central sierra of Peru.

Poverty
Comas is one of the poorest districts in Lima, recently Comas has been developed into a low-middle class residential district. But, in 2019 started the Real PLaza, it is Mall in the center town, the Mall Real Plaza has major brand stores such as Adidas, Nike, Saga Falabella, Tottus, Puma, Maui and sons, etc

Transport and communications
There are 3 main roads serving the district: Avenida Túpac Amaru, Avenida Universitaria and the Chillón-Trapiche Highway.

Today
In the last decade Comas' economy, infrastructure, and social structure has grown at a very fast pace. It boasts a large middle-class, and has grown from a pueblo joven in a very short period of time. However, in spite of this visible progress; it's still exhibiting vast swathes of new pueblos jovenes growing around the area that is today's Comas.

The only civil aviation school in Peru was located in Comas, at the Aeroclub de Collique.

See also 
 Administrative divisions of Peru

References

External links
  Municipalidad Distrital de Comas - Comas District Council official website
  ComasWeb - Comas District Portal

Districts of Lima